Nandi County is a county in Kenya in the North Rift, occupying an area of 2,884.4 square kilometres. Its capital, Kapsabet, is the largest town in the county while other towns include Mosoriot, Tinderet, Kobujoi, Kaiboi, Kabiyet and Nandi Hills. According to a 2019 census, the county had a population of 885,711, made up of a number of Kenyan communities, the majority of whom belong to the native tribe called Nandi.

Geographically, the unique jug-shaped structure of Nandi County is bound by the Equator to the south and extends northwards to latitude 0034’N. The western boundary extends to west. The county's major area is covered by the Nandi Hills.

History
Historically, Nandi like other Kalenjin areas was divided into districts known as emotinwek (sing. emet). There were six emotinwek in Nandi which were Wareñg in the north, Mosop in the East, Soiin (also known as Pelkut) in the south-east, Aldai and Chesumei in the west and Em'gwen in the center.

The districts were further divided into divisions known as bororiōsiek (sing. bororiet) which were made up of several villages known as koret.

Settlement

The traditional Nandi account is that the first settlers in Nandi came from Elgon and formed the Kipoiis clan; a name that possibly means 'the spirits'. They were led by a man named Kakipoch, founder of the Nandi section of the Kalenjin and are said to have settled in the emet of Aldai in south-western Nandi. One of the early Nandi bororiōsiek was named after Kakipoch.

Studies of the settlement pattern indicate that the southern regions were the first to be settled. As of 1910, these comprised the emet of Aldai on the west and the, by then annexed, emet of Soiin on the east. It was conjectured that the first pororiosiek were Kakipoch in Aldai and Tuken in Soiin.

It is notable that Sirikwa holes (known to the Nandi as mukowanisiek) were almost non-existent in the areas first settled, being only present on the Nandi Escarpment itself. They were however found in great numbers in the northern regions of Nandi.

Inward migrants and general population growth are thought to have led to a northward expansion of the growing identity during the eighteenth century. This period is thought to have seen the occupation and establishment of the emotinwek of Chesume, Emgwen and Masop. This period would also have seen the establishment of more pororosiek.

The final expansion occurred during the middle of the nineteenth century when the Nandi took the Uain Gishu plateau from the Uasin Gishu. Traditions contained in the tale of Tapkendi however seem to indicate that the plateau was previously held by the Nandi and that Nandi place names were superseded by Maasai names. This is further evinced by certain "Masai place-names in eastern Nandi which indicate that the Masai had temporary possession of strip of Nandi roughly five miles wide", these include Ndalat, Lolkeringeti, Nduele and Ol-lesos, which were by the early nineteenth century in use by the Nandi as koret names.

Late 19th century
Nandi county was the scene of the resistance struggle that has come to be known as the Nandi Resistance. The traditional system of governance came to an end c.1905 with the end of the resistance struggle. This was followed by the subsequent absorption of Nandi into the East African Protectorate in 1905 and later into the Kenya Colony in 1920.

The Emet of Wareng was amalgamated into the Uasin Gishu district during the colonial period. It is today part of Uasin Gishu County and last bore its name as a county of Eldoret South Constituency. The Emet of Soiin would be appropriated for European occupation, as part of what were known as the white highlands, during the colonial period. It was later split in two and is today named after the Tinderet and Nandi Hills.

Population

Sub-counties 
The county has six subcounties: 
 Mosop Subcounty
 Emgwen Subcounty
 Aldai Subcounty
 Tinderet Subcounty
 Nandi Hills Subcounty
 Chesumei Subcounty

Wards

The county is further sub-divided into 30 wards namely:

Defunct local authorities

Constituencies
The county consists of six constituencies: 151. Tinderet, 152. Aldai, 153. Nandi Hills, 154. Chesumei, 155. Emgwen, 156. Mosop.

Education and sports

Nandi County is home to many world record holders in athletics, including Kipchoge Keino, Henry Rono, Eliud Kipchoge, Pamela Jelimo, Janeth Jepkosgei, Moses Tanui, Julius Yego, Jairus Birech, Conseslus Kipruto and Bernard Lagat.

There are 443 primary education schools and 80 secondary education schools in Nandi.

Kapsabet Boys High school, situated in Kapsabet and founded in 1925, is a prominent national school. Its list of alumni includes cabinet ministers such as Nicholas Biwott, Kipruto Arap Kirwa, Henry Kosgey and William Arap Ruto who is currently the Kenyan Deputy President. Sports stars such as Julius Yego went here and a former President of Kenya, Daniel Arap Moi.

Economy
 Industries: Agriculture, sports, and tourism
 Major crops: Tea, maize, coffee, and sugarcane
 Poverty level: 13.7%

Tea

Nandi county is endowed with a scenic topography that is dotted with numerous tea plantations. These provide the raw material for the county's most vibrant agricultural industry, tea processing.

It hosts fifteen of Kenya's tea factories.

Tourism
Nandi County is renowned for its heritage, landscapes, its cool highland climate and vistas of rolling tea plantations.

Notable destinations

Nandi Hills town and the surrounding region

Home to a number of tea estates as well as the Koitalel Samoei Museum, Kapsimotwa Gardens and the Nandi Bears Club.

Koitalel arap Samoei mausoleum and museum
Koitalel Arap Samoei Museum was instituted in commemoration of Koitalel arap Samoei, a traditional spiritual leader of the Nandi. It incorporates a mausoleum as well as a center that display of the cultural heritage of the larger Kalenjin community.

Keben
The area is home to the Ngabunat caves, the site of ancient battles between the Nandi and Maasai – one of which led to the capture of Moki chebo Cheplabot and establishment of the second Orkoinotet.

Nandi rock
This, is the most prominent rock formation along the whole length of the Nandi (Nyando) Escarpment, is a 30-minute walk from the KWS post at Kaptumek.

Chepkiit Water Falls
Tucked some two kilometres from Eldoret International Airport, off the Eldoret-Kapsabet road, Chepkiit waterfall in Nandi County is one of the marvels of mother nature, carved out of the magnificent walls of the Great Rift Valley.

Health
There are three hospitals, 45 dispensaries, and 9 health care centers in Nandi.  It has a doctor to population ratio of 1:94,000

References

Exteran link

Counties of Kenya
Nandi County